Stefan Klopper (born 19 February 1996) is a South African cricketer. He made his first-class debut for Northerns in the 2016–17 Sunfoil 3-Day Cup on 9 February 2017. He made his List A debut for Northerns in the 2016–17 CSA Provincial One-Day Challenge on 12 March 2017.

References

External links
 

1996 births
Living people
South African cricketers
Northerns cricketers
Cricketers from Pretoria